Miklós Kocsis (16 October 1932 – 5 November 2004) was a Hungarian sports shooter. He competed in the 100 metre running deer event at the 1956 Summer Olympics.

References

External links
 

1932 births
2004 deaths
Hungarian male sport shooters
Olympic shooters of Hungary
Shooters at the 1956 Summer Olympics
Sportspeople from Szabolcs-Szatmár-Bereg County
20th-century Hungarian people